Curtain Call at Cactus Creek is a 1950 American Western comedy film starring Donald O'Connor and Gale Storm. In the story, a traveling entertainer (O'Connor) gets mixed up with bank robbers.

Plot
A traveling troupe of entertainers arrives in Cactus Creek, Arizona, to put on a show. The act's stars are singer Lily Martin and her niece Julie and the flamboyant actor Tracy Holland, while a frustrated Eddie Timmons handles the lighting, sound effects and other duties, even though his ambition is to perform on stage. Eddie's in love with Julie.

The bandit Rimrock Thomas turns up with his gang to rob the bank. Rimrock gets an idea while watching Lily Martin perform. He will coincide the robbery with the next show. Rimrock's presence disturbs Eddie and ends up disrupting the performance. When an explosion is heard from the direction of the bank, the audience flees. So do the entertainers, who don't want to give the customers a refund.

Rimrock hides in Eddie's wagon. He decides to keep using the show as a front, teaching Eddie how to become a successful outlaw. Eddie gets caught by a sheriff, but Rimrock has taken a shine to the young man and breaks him out of jail. When he's cornered, Rimrock arranges it so that it appears Eddie is the one who captured him. Eddie collects a $26,000 reward and vows to go straight, but Rimrock expects to see him again very soon.

Cast
 Donald O'Connor as Edward Timmons
 Gale Storm as Julie Martin
 Walter Brennan as Rimrock Thomas
 Vincent Price as Tracy Holland
 Eve Arden as Lily Martin
 Chick Chandler as Ralph
 Joe Sawyer as Jake
 Harry Shannon as U.S. Marshal Clay
 Rex Lease as Yellowstone
 I. Stanford Jolley as Pecos

External links
 

1950 films
1950s Western (genre) comedy films
American Western (genre) comedy films
1950s English-language films
Films directed by Charles Lamont
Films scored by Walter Scharf
Universal Pictures films
1950 comedy films
1950s American films